Willard Saulsbury Sr. (June 2, 1820 – April 6, 1892) was an American lawyer and politician from Georgetown, Delaware. He was a member of the Democratic Party, who served as Attorney General of Delaware, U.S. Senator from Delaware and Chancellor of Delaware.

Early life and family
Saulsbury was born in Mispillion Hundred, Kent County, Delaware, son of William & Margaret Ann Smith Saulsbury. He was a younger brother of Governor Gove Saulsbury and U.S. Senator Eli M. Saulsbury. He married Annie Ponder, sister of Governor James Ponder, and they had three children, John Ponder, Margaret, and Willard Jr.  They were members of the Episcopal Church. Saulsbury was educated at Dickinson College and Delaware College, which is now the University of Delaware, studied law, was admitted to the Delaware Bar, and began his practice in Georgetown, Delaware. He was a slaveholder.

Political career
Saulsbury was the Delaware Attorney General from 1850 until 1855, and was elected to the United States Senate in 1858, defeating incumbent U.S. Senator Martin W. Bates. Saulsbury was reelected in 1864, but was defeated for a third term in 1870 by his older brother, Eli M. Saulsbury. He served two full terms from March 4, 1859, to March 4, 1871. He then continued his law practice and served as Chancellor of Delaware from 1873 until his death in 1892.

In 1863, Saulsbury was a vehement critic of President Abraham Lincoln's administration.  Opposing the war in general and the suspension of habeas corpus specifically, Saulsbury attempted to prevent a vote sustaining that controversial executive order.  Apparently intoxicated, Saulsbury verbally attacked the President on the Senate floor in what John Hay described as "language fit only for a drunken fishwife".  Senator Saulsbury called Lincoln "an imbecile" and stated that the President was "the weakest man ever placed in a high office".  When Vice President Hannibal Hamlin called Saulsbury to order, the Senator refused to take his seat.  Finally, the Senate's sergeant-at-arms approached to remove Saulsbury from the Senate floor when the Senator suddenly brandished a revolver, placed it against the sergeant's head and said, "Damn you, if you touch me I'll shoot you dead!"  Eventually, Saulsbury was calmed and removed from the Senate floor.

Death and legacy
Saulsbury died at Dover and is buried there in the Christ Episcopal Church Cemetery. His son Willard Saulsbury Jr. was also a U.S. Senator.

Almanac
The General Assembly chose the U.S. Senators, who took office March 4 for a six-year term.

References

Images
Biographical Directory of the United States Congress

External links
Biographical Directory of the United States Congress
Delaware’s Members of Congress

 The Political Graveyard

Places with more information
Delaware Historical Society; website ; 505 Market St, Wilmington, Delaware; (302) 655-7161
University of Delaware; Library website; 181 South College Ave, Newark, Delaware; (302) 831-2965

1820 births
1893 deaths
19th-century American Episcopalians
People from Georgetown, Delaware
People of Delaware in the American Civil War
University of Delaware alumni
Dickinson College alumni
Delaware lawyers
Delaware Democrats
Delaware Attorneys General
Democratic Party United States senators from Delaware
Chancellors of Delaware
Burials in Dover, Delaware
Saulsbury family
19th-century American politicians
19th-century American judges
19th-century American lawyers
American slave owners